The Minister of Marine in New Zealand was a former cabinet member appointed by the Prime Minister to be responsible for New Zealand's marine transport, aquaculture and fishing industries and in charge of the New Zealand Marine Department. The portfolio was abolished in 1972 with responsibilities split between the Minister of Transport (marine transport) and Minister of Agriculture (aquaculture and fishing). Similar duties are performed today by the Minister of Transport and Minister of Fisheries.

List of ministers
The following ministers held the office of Minister of Marine.

Key

See also
 Aquaculture in New Zealand
 Fishing industry in New Zealand

Notes

References

Marine